Earnie Dee Shaver (August 31, 1944 – September 1, 2022), best known as Earnie Shavers, was an American professional boxer who competed between 1969 and 1995. A two-time world heavyweight championship challenger, he is known as one of the hardest punchers in heavyweight boxing history. He scored 70 knockout wins, including 23 in the first round, for a 76.7% overall knockout rate.

Shavers challenged unsuccessfully twice for the heavyweight championship, losing to Muhammad Ali in 1977 and to Larry Holmes in 1979. He hurt Ali in the second round and knocked down Holmes in the seventh round. Shavers defeated former world champions Vicente Rondón, Jimmy Ellis, and Ken Norton, as well as three-time European heavyweight champion Joe Bugner and top heavyweight contender  Jimmy Young.

In 2001, Shavers released an autobiography called Welcome to the Big Time. After retiring from boxing he continued to attend boxing events as a special guest, autograph signer, and motivational speaker.

Amateur career
Shavers started boxing at the late age of 22. Before turning professional, he had a short but notable amateur career, winning the 1969 National AAU heavyweight title.

In March 1969, National Golden Gloves director Tony Mange said Shavers "carries a hefty punch". He had nine straight knockout wins before he was himself knocked out by the 230-pound (104 kg) West German Horst Koschemann.

Highlights

 Cleveland Golden Gloves, Cleveland, Ohio, 1968:
Finals: Defeated Mike Boswell
National Golden Gloves, Salt Lake City, Utah, March 1968:
1/8: Defeated Dave Foley
1/4: Defeated Tommy Garrett by decision
1/2: Lost to Frank Steele TKO 3
United States National Championships, Toledo, Ohio, April 1968:
1/8: Lost to Chuck Haynes TKO
National Golden Gloves, Municipal Auditorium, Kansas City, Missouri, March 1969:
1/8: Defeated Bernard Roberts KO 1 
1/4: Defeated Nick Wells by decision
1/2: Lost to Ron Draper by decision

 United States National Championships, San Diego, California, April 1969:
1/8: Defeated Wayne McGee KO
1/4: Defeated Mose Hill Jr. KO 2
1/2: Defeated Otis Evans KO
Finals: Defeated Charles Elder TKO 1 
USA–FRG Duals, Cincinnati Gardens, Cincinnati, Ohio, June 1969:
Lost to Horst Koschemann (West Germany) TKO 2 
Ohio State Fair Amateur Boxing Tournament, State Fairgrounds, Columbus, Ohio, August 1969:

National Team Selection Eliminator, Fort Campbell, Kentucky, October 1969:
Lost to Charles Elder by decision

Shavers posted a 20–6 amateur record as a heavyweight and recorded 14 knockouts (with half of those losses also by knockout.)

Professional career

Early bouts
Known as the "Black Destroyer", Shavers won 44 of his first 47 fights by knockout; mostly against unremarkable opposition. This included 27 consecutive knockouts, of which 20 were in the first round. He suffered setbacks with a unanimous decision loss in his 3rd bout to Stan Johnson, who was a replacement opponent for Wayne West, and a 5th round KO loss to then undefeated Ron Stander.

He began to rise to the upper ranks of the heavyweight division after he hired Cleveland-based promoter Don King to be his manager. His wins included one over a novice Jimmy Young who later became a world championship contender. Stepping up the class of his opposition, he came to public prominence with a first-round KO of one time WBA heavyweight champion Jimmy Ellis. His progress was halted when he was KO'd in the first round by Jerry Quarry, which was followed by another loss to a journeyman Bob Stallings. Shavers then had a thunderous match with hard hitting Ron Lyle but was stopped after 6 brutal rounds. He then knocked out hard hitter Howard Smith and beat powerful prospect Roy Williams in a brutal back and forward battle in which Shavers was nearly knocked out, a match Shavers maintained was one of the toughest of his career.

Fighting champions

Shavers vs Ali

Shavers fought Muhammad Ali at Madison Square Garden on September 29, 1977. Coming into the bout, Shavers had a record of 54–5–1, with 52 knockouts. Ali nicknamed Shavers "The Acorn" because of his shaved bald head. The fight was shown in prime time broadcast television by NBC, which rarely did prime time fights (ABC tended to get the Ali fights) and had the judges' scoring announced after each round to help avoid any controversial decision. Ali's cornerman Angelo Dundee asked Baltimore matchmaker Eddie Hrica to watch the broadcast in the dressing room and signal on the scoring. In the second round, Shavers hurt Ali with an overhand right. Ali play-acted that he was seriously hurt, and Shavers hesitated. On the scorecard they exchanged rounds. Ali won the fifth decisively. To win the fight Ali had to survive the last three rounds. Shavers, whose stamina was suspect before the fight, came alive in the 13th round. In the 14th, he battered Ali about the ring. Before the 15th, according to Sports Illustrated boxing writer Pat Putnam, "Ali was on very wobbly legs."

Realizing Ali needed to last three more minutes, Dundee told him, "You don't look so good. You better go out and take this round." In a furious final round, the two men tagged each other, but Ali closed strongly, nearly dropping Shavers in the last 20 seconds. He won a unanimous decision. The next day, Garden matchmaker Teddy Brenner encouraged Ali to retire by stating the Garden would never make another offer to host an Ali fight. Brenner also thought that Shavers deserved the nod against Ali. The fight made the cover of Sports Illustrated, with "ALI'S DESPERATE HOUR" featuring a photograph of Shavers scoring with an overhand right. Ali's fight doctor Ferdie Pacheco also urged Ali to retire after noting the punishment Ali had absorbed against Shavers. Ali later said Shavers was the hardest puncher he ever faced, comparing him favorably to Joe Frazier and George Foreman. Ali also stated that "Earnie hit me so hard, it shook my kinfolk back in Africa" - a quip Ali had previously used to describe other hard-hitting opponents.

Shavers vs Holmes I
Shavers, being the No.3 WBC contender, then fought No. 4 WBC contender Larry Holmes at Caesars Palace for an elimination bout for the WBC world heavyweight title, the winner to face WBC heavyweight champion Ken Norton. The fight happened at Paradise, Nevada on March 25, 1978. Holmes won by a 12 round unanimous decision.

Shavers vs Norton
In a mandatory title challenge eliminator Earnie Shavers knocked out former champion Ken Norton in the first round. The victory is widely regarded as the best win of his career and earned him a bout with WBC champion Larry Holmes.

Shavers vs Holmes II
Shavers and Holmes fought once again on September 29, 1979 again at Caesars Palace, this time for the WBC title. Shavers knocked Holmes down in round seven but after taking a series of punches in the eleventh round and seeming defenseless, the referee stopped the fight awarding a TKO win for Larry Holmes. Holmes, known for his ability to take a punch, later said that Shavers' knockdown blow in the seventh round was the hardest he had ever taken in his career.

Later career
The Holmes rematch was the last big fight for Shavers. In 1980, in a wild slugfest he was stopped in the eighth round by durable prospect Randall "Tex" Cobb. Prior to the Cobb fight, Shavers had undergone eye surgery for a detached retina. (Since eye surgery was not nearly as refined then as it is today, the majority of boxers retired for good after that kind of injury. In the words of Duane Ford of the Nevada Athletic Commission, a detached retina for a boxer was like an AIDS diagnosis). Shavers had not fully recovered from the surgery when he came back for the Cobb fight. He never again fought for the world title. In 1982 he fought Joe Bugner, also on the comeback trail. Bugner was knocked down in the first, and was stopped by cuts in the second round.

Shavers continued to fight professionally for several years, retiring in 1995 after losing to Brian Yates. Many thought he should have retired after his upset loss to lower contender Bernardo Mercado. Shavers had a similar retinal eye injury as Sugar Ray Leonard.

Comeback
Shavers attempted two abbreviated comebacks–—a fight in 1987, and two in 1995, in the second of which he was KO'd by Brian Yates in round 2.  After this loss, Shavers retired for good.

Shavers has been named among the top-10 punchers in boxing history by The Ring and others.

Shavers finished his career in 1995 with a record of 76 wins (70 by knockout, 23 inside the first round, with 52 in the first 3 rounds), 14 losses (7 by knockout), and 1 draw.

Fighting style

Shavers was an exceptionally heavy puncher who stalked his opponents, setting them up for his thunderous right, which was responsible for many of his knockouts, although Angelo Dundee in a Sports Illustrated mid-1970s article said "He can get you out of there with any kind of shot", referring to Shavers's ability to inflict damage with a left hook, right cross or right uppercut. Several boxers famous for their tough chins had fallen to Shavers's punches, including Bugner and Ellis who were felled by his uppercut.

Shavers would throw punches against any legal area he could reach, exposed or covered, relying on his tremendous power to wear down his opponents and exploiting any opening. His fighting stance produced a short and powerful image. His chin was his weakness. He could however "box" as well as slug. Notably, he injured his right hand early in a 10-round match against rated craftsman Henry Clark and responded with  a strong jabbing performance to beat Clark, himself noted for his jabbing ability, on points.

Video and book
Shavers published a video of highlights of his career in 1992 titled Earnie D. Shavers, The hardest one-punch hitter, and later an autobiography.

Life after boxing

Shavers retired in 1983 after retinal problems were discovered. After retirement, he became an ordained Christian minister and moved to Phoenix, where he preached for many years. He moved to England to pastor a church there in the early 2000s. He was on the Benny Hinn TV show several times.

During the early 1980s while preparing for the feature film Rocky III, Sylvester Stallone explored the possibility of using a real heavyweight boxer in the role of James "Clubber" Lang by inviting Earnie Shavers to spar with him. Shavers initially refused to hit Stallone with anything other than a soft jab. This frustrated Stallone, who asked Shavers, "C'mon Earnie, show me something real." Earnie responded by punching him once near the liver, forcing an immediate retirement; Stallone later said: "that nearly killed me. I went straight to the men's room and threw up". However, according to Rhonda Young, the film's casting director, the reason why he was eventually not chosen for the part is that his voice was too high-pitched and not menacing enough (Joe Frazier was also considered).

Shavers visited Ali several times and he said that he, Ali, and George Foreman became very good friends over the years. Foreman, when asked about toughest and hardest punching opponent he ever met in the ring, said:
Foreman: You only meet three genuine punchers throughout your career: Gerry Cooney, Ron Lyle and Cleveland Williams, and they hit so hard that it vibrates your body even if you block, it just goes right through you.
Letterman: What about Earnie Shavers?
Foreman: I never fought Earnie Shavers. Thank goodness.

Shavers accepted the invitation of the Full Gospel Business Men's Fellowship International to preach at the 2002 Commonwealth Games in Manchester.

He also worked in Liverpool in the UK, as head of security at Hannah's bar, where he was very much respected. Until 2009, he worked at Yates' Wine Lodge in Liverpool "meeting and greeting". On occasion Shavers was a troubleshooting referee in professional wrestling after his retirement.

He was also a Patron of The Shannon Bradshaw Trust, a children's charity based in Warrington, Cheshire, helping children with life-threatening conditions, and their families.

Shavers spoke to pupils at Barr Beacon Language College in Walsall. He also gave a speech on 26 February 2008 at The Streetly School in Walsall, which was based upon helping kids make the right decisions in life.

Personal life
Shavers was married to Laverne Payne. They had five daughters from their marriage together: Tamara, Cynthia, Catherine, Carla, and Amy. He also has four daughters from other relationships: Catherine, Lisa, Natasha, and Latonya. He has 24 grandchildren and one great-grandchild. He worked at General Motors in Lordstown, Ohio in the late 1960s. Shavers made a guest appearance on the Irish TV programme The Late Late Show hosted by Ron Lyle where the two fighters discussed their previous bout that had happened a month earlier. Shavers was a frequent visitor to the pub "Roddy Bolands" in Dublin. There is a signed picture of Shavers drinking a pint of Guinness on the wall there.

Shavers died on September 1, 2022, from a short-illness at his daughter's home in Virginia, aged 78.

Professional boxing record

References

External links

 

1944 births
2022 deaths
American Christian clergy
Heavyweight boxers
Professional wrestling referees
Winners of the United States Championship for amateur boxers
African-American boxers
American male boxers
Sportspeople with a vision impairment
People from Butler County, Alabama
Boxers from Alabama
21st-century African-American people
20th-century African-American sportspeople